
Year 434 (CDXXXIV) was a common year starting on Monday (link will display the full calendar) of the Julian calendar. At the time, it was known as the Year of the Consulship of Aspar and Areobindus (or, less frequently, year 1187 Ab urbe condita). The denomination 434 for this year has been used since the early medieval period, when the Anno Domini calendar era became the prevalent method in Europe for naming years.

Events 
<onlyinclude>

By place

Roman Empire 
 Flavius Aetius, Roman general (magister militum) in the service of Emperor Valentinian III, begins to hold power in Rome (this will continue for 20 years). He allows the Huns to settle in Pannonia, along the Sava River. 
 Justa Grata Honoria, older sister of Valentinian, becomes pregnant from an officer in her household. Circles in the court at Ravenna assume inevitably that Honoria is planning to raise her paramour to imperial rank and challenge her brother. Valentinian then has him executed.    
 Summer – The Huns under Rugila devastate Thrace and move steadily towards Constantinople. The citizens prepare themselves for a long siege, depending on the strength of the Theodosian Walls. 
 Emperor Theodosius II bribes the Huns (after the death of Rugila) to keep the peace in the Eastern Roman Empire.

Africa 
 The Vandals in North Africa defeat the Roman general Aspar and force him to withdraw. He serves as consul at Constantinople.

Europe 
 Attila, king of the Huns, consolidates his power in the Hungarian capital, probably on the site of Buda (modern Budapest). He jointly rules the kingdom with his brother Bleda.

By topic

Religion 
 April 12 – Maximianus dies on Great and Holy Thursday. He is succeeded by  Proclus, who becomes archbishop of Constantinople.

Deaths 
 April 12 – Maximianus, archbishop of Constantinople
 Helian Chang, emperor of the Chinese Xiongnu state Xia
 Rugila, king of the Huns (approximate date)
 Tao Sheng, Chinese Buddhist scholar

References